The W. D. Mayo Lock and Dam (also known as: W. D. Mayo Lock and Dam 14) on the Arkansas River is an integral part of the McClellan-Kerr Arkansas River Navigation System (MKARNS). It is the first lock and dam west of the Arkansas-Oklahoma state line. It was named for a deceased Sallisaw, Oklahoma businessman who was also a civic leader and champion of fully developing the river. The number 14 designates this facility as the fourteenth in sequence from the start of MKARNS. It lies in LeFlore and Sequoyah Counties, Oklahoma.

Facility description
Construction of the lock and dam began in May, 1966, and closure was completed on October 15, 1970. It became operational for navigation in December, 1970. The dam is managed by the U.S. Army Corps of Engineers.

The -long dam consists of a low concrete apron and sill surmounted by tainter gates separated by  concrete piers. The gates are operated with machinery constructed on the piers. Twelve  by  tainter gates are provided for the structure.

The lock has a  normal lift and  maximum lift.

Recreation
Three areas on the lake shoreline have been developed specifically for boat ramps and lake access. These are: Arkoma Park, LeFlore Landing, and Wilson's Rock. No other facilities are available at these boat ramps.

Other activities at W.D. Mayo Lock and Dam include boating, camping, picnicking, water skiing, jet skiing, sailing, and wildlife viewing. Pets are allowed.

References

External links
"5 Oklahoma Locks and Dams on the Ark. River Navigation Systems." U.S. Army Corps of Engineers, Southwestern District November 10, 2016.

Dams completed in 1970
Geography of Le Flore County, Oklahoma
Geography of Sequoyah County, Oklahoma
Reservoirs in Oklahoma